Big Brother 2011 may refer to:

Big Brother 2011 (Finland)
Big Brother 2011 (Indonesia)
Big Brother 2011 (Sweden)
Big Brother 12 (UK)
Celebrity Big Brother 8 (UK)
Big Brother 13 (U.S.)

DABs
2011 American television seasons
2011 British television seasons
2011 Finnish television seasons
2011 Indonesian television seasons
2011 Swedish television seasons